Sinclair Alexander Whittaker (1888 – July 10, 1974) was a merchant and political figure in Saskatchewan. He represented Moose Jaw County from 1929 to 1934 in the Legislative Assembly of Saskatchewan as a Conservative.

He was born in Port Perry, Ontario and, in 1910, moved to Briercrest, Saskatchewan. He operated a small chain of general stores in the province. Sinclair helped found the Briercrest Bible Institute and served as chairman of the board for the institute. He also was chairman of the Retail Merchants Association of Saskatchewan. He was defeated by Thomas Waddell when he ran for reelection in 1934.

References 

Progressive Conservative Party of Saskatchewan MLAs
1888 births
1974 deaths
People from Scugog